Ghosha was an ancient Vedic period Indian female philosopher and seer. From a young age she suffered from a skin ailment which had disfigured her. Ashvini Kumars cured her and restored her youthfulness, health and beauty. As a result, she got married and had a son. She was proficient in the Vedas and had even scripted two hymns in the Rigveda. She was called as mantradrika meaning well versed in mantras. She was also known as a Brahmavadini or speaker or proclaimer of Brahmana and led a purposeful spiritual life.

Biography
Ghosha was born during the Vedic period in India. Her father was Kakshivat and grandfather was Dīrghatamas and both of them had written hymns in the Rigveda. She was suffering from a skin ailment and was confined to the house attending to her father. According to a hymn, she suffered from leprosy, which had disfigured her. She was thus a celibate for a long period. She fervently prayed to Ashvins, the divine physician twins of the time, who were proficient in rejuvenation. They taught her Madhu Vidhya, a Vedic teaching, a science of secret learning to restore youth and acquire immense knowledge, to get her cured of skin ailment. Because of her constant prayers Ashvini Kumars cured her skin problem and restored her beauty. She was then married. She had a son, Suhstya, who also composed a hymn in the Rigveda.

Ghosha composed two hymns in praise of the Ashvini Kumars which are contained in two suktas (hymns) of the tenth Mandala (book) of Rigveda, chapter X hymns 39 and 40, each containing 14 verses. The first hymn praises the Ashvins. The second hymn is a personal desire expressing her intimate feelings and desires for married life. The two hymns are:

References

Bibliography

Ancient Indian philosophers
Ancient Indian writers
Hindu philosophers and theologians
Year of birth unknown
Year of death unknown
Indian women philosophers
Ancient Indian women writers
Women mystics
8th-century BC Indian philosophers
8th-century BC Hindus